A Night in a Moorish Harem is an erotic novella published in 1896 under the pseudonym "Lord George Herbert". It is written in the first person in the persona of a shipwrecked British sailor, recounting the night he spent in a Moroccan harem with nine concubines of different nationalities.  The literary topos of the harem has been classified by some as a typical example of Western literary orientalism.

In December 1923, two New York booksellers, Maurice Inman and Max Gottschalk, were arrested for selling A Night in a Moorish Harem and convicted in March 1924. However, by 1930, a prosecution in Chicago for selling the book failed, as did another in New York in 1931.

See also

The Lustful Turk

References
 Paul S. Boyer, Purity in Print: book censorship in America from the Gilded Age to the Computer Age (Print Culture History in Modern America), Univ of Wisconsin Press, 2002, ; p. 136
 Gaétan Brulotte, John Phillips, 'Encyclopedia of Erotic Literature, CRC Press, 2006, p. 441
 Jay A. Gertzman, Bookleggers and Smuthounds: the trade in erotica, 1920-1940, University of Pennsylvania Press, 1999, pp. 95, 284
 Marie-Luise Kohlke, Luisa Orza, Negotiating Sexual Idioms: image, text, performance. (At the interface/probing the boundaries; 53). Amsterdam: Rodopi, 2008, p. 69
 David Goldsmith Loth, The Erotic in Literature: a historical survey of pornography as delightful as it is indiscreet, London: Secker & Warburg, 1961, pp. 139–140
 Steven Marcus, The Other Victorians: a study of sexuality and pornography in mid-nineteenth-century England, Transaction Publishers, 2008, p. 268
 İrvin Cemil Schick, The Erotic Margin: sexuality and spatiality in alteritist discourse, Verso, 1999, pp. 200–204

External links

British erotic novels
English novels
Works published under a pseudonym
1896 British novels